Butteri is the plural form of Buttero, a shepherd or cowboy in parts of central Italy.

Butteri may also refer to:
Angiola Guglielma Butteri, 17th-century Italian artist and nun
Francesco Butteri (born 1954), Italian bobsledder
Giovanni Maria Butteri (1540–1606), Italian painter